German submarine U-596 was a Type VIIC U-boat built for Nazi Germany's Kriegsmarine for service during World War II.
She was laid down on 4 January 1941 by Blohm & Voss in Hamburg as yard number 572, launched on 17 September 1941 and commissioned on 13 November under Kapitänleutnant Gunter Jahn. He was replaced on 28 July 1943 by Oberleutnant zur See Victor-Whilhelm Nonn who was superseded by Oblt.z.S. Hans Kolbus in July 1944.

The boat's service began on 13 November 1941 with training as part of the 8th U-boat Flotilla. She was transferred to the 3rd flotilla on 1 July 1942 and moved on to the 29th flotilla on 19 November.

Design
German Type VIIC submarines were preceded by the shorter Type VIIB submarines. U-596 had a displacement of  when at the surface and  while submerged. She had two shafts and two  propellers.

U-596 was fitted with five  torpedo tubes (four fitted at the bow and one at the stern), fourteen torpedoes, one  SK C/35 naval gun, 220 rounds, and a  C/30 anti-aircraft gun. The boat had a complement of between forty-four and sixty.

Service history

Her initial sortie from Kiel was cut short by a battery explosion on 28 June 1942. She was obliged to put into Bergen in Norway.

First patrol
Her first patrol saw her depart Bergen on 8 August 1942, cross the North Sea and move through the gap between Iceland and the Faroe Islands into the Atlantic. There she sank the Suecia with a torpedo on 16 August, having first checked the ships' papers. No damage was sustained. U-596 lost a man overboard on 30 August in mid-Atlantic. The boat then docked at St. Nazaire in occupied France on 3 October.

Second patrol
Her next foray from St. Nazaire took the U-boat as part of group 'Delphin' to La Spezia in northern Italy. Her route involved passing the heavily defended Strait of Gibraltar, which she successfully accomplished in the darkness during the period of the new moon from 8–10 November 1942.

Third and fourth patrols
U-596s third patrol took her past the Balearic Islands to the Algerian coast near Oran. It was unsuccessful.

Her fourth foray yielded some reward. Between Algiers and Oran she damaged Fort Norman and Empire Standard, both on 9 March 1943.

Fifth and sixth patrols
Her fifth outing, in the same area as her third and fourth patrols, was rewarded with the sinking of the Fort a la Corne west of Algiers on 30 March 1943.

Her home port was moved from La Spezia to Pola in Croatia; she sailed from there on her sixth patrol, but it was uneventful.

Seventh and eighth patrols
Patrol number seven was marked by the sinking of several Egyptian, a Palestinian and British-registered sailing ships off the Lebanon coast with her deck gun in August and September 1943.

During her eighth patrol, she sank Marit off the Libyan coast on 4 October, but was attacked by the British corvette . Although slightly damaged, the U-boat escaped.

Ninth, tenth and eleventh patrols
U-596 departed Pola on 30 November but it was not until many days later that she sank the Troop Transport Cap Padaran off Cape Spartivento in Italy on 9 December. She returned to Pola on 28 December 1943.

Another unsuccessful patrol passed between 12 February and 11 March 1944.

The boat barely left the Adriatic for patrol number eleven.

Twelfth patrol
What turned out to be the last complete patrol by a U-boat in the Mediterranean began with U-596s departure from Pola on 29 July 1944. Her route was to the Gulf of Sirte on the Libyan coast. Her arrival at Salamis in Greece was followed by the USAAF (United States Army Air Forces) bombing the port on 29 September (USAAF records say the 25th). The boat was sufficiently damaged that the crew were forced to abandon her and join the general retreat through Athens.

Fate
The submarine was scuttled on 30 September 1944 in Skaramanga Bay, near Salamis in position . One person died; the number of survivors is unknown.

Summary of raiding history

References

Notes

Citations

Bibliography

External links

German Type VIIC submarines
U-boats commissioned in 1941
U-boats scuttled in 1944
World War II submarines of Germany
World War II shipwrecks in the Mediterranean Sea
1941 ships
Ships built in Hamburg
Maritime incidents in September 1944